Muthalamada is a railway station on the  Palakkad–Pollachi line which is a branch line between Palakkad Jn and Pollachi Jn in the state of Kerala near to Tamil Nadu, India.

History
The line was functioning completely between Palakkad Junction and Palakkad Town. The section of the line between Palakkad Town and Pollachi completed safety testing on 2 October 2015. The safety inspection that followed conversion of the track was completed on 7 October 2015. The line was approved for passenger train services by the Commissioner of Railway Safety on 8 October 2015.

Trains
The train services running currently through Muthalamada Railway Station are as follows:-

Mail/Express Trains
 16731 - Palakkad Junction (PGT) to Thiruchendur (TCN)
 16732 - Thiruchendur (TCN) to Palakkad Junction (PGT)

See also
 Vandithavalam

References

Railway stations in Palakkad district
Palakkad railway division